Košarkaški klub Zagreb, commonly referred to as KK Zagreb or simply Zagreb, was a professional basketball club based in Zagreb, Croatia. It competed in the ABA League and the Croatian League. In the 2011–12 season, the club competed in the modern EuroLeague.

History
The club was founded in 1970 under the name KK Siget after the Siget neighbourhood in Zagreb. In 1976 it was renamed to KK Novi Zagreb to represent Novi Zagreb, part of Zagreb located south of the Sava river. After Croatia became independent country, "Novi" was just dropped out and the club name got its simpler and present form - KK Zagreb. From the beginnings Zagreb players were known under the nickname Ants as a symbol of hard work and team spirit.

Since its establishment KK Zagreb worked its way up over 19 years to join the famed first division in ex-Yugoslavia in 1989. Though it carries the name of a great basketball capital KK Zagreb had always lived a bit in the shadow of cross-town rival Cibona but since the beginning of the Croatian League in the early 1990s Zagreb has made a name of its own, becoming one of the better teams in the country. Until the late 2000s club was mainly known for its youth categories which won numerous Croatian and European titles, while senior team was always in the shadow of Croatian basketball Big Three - Cibona, Zadar and Split. In recent years, when its became a permanent member of the EuroChallenge Cup competition, the club increased its budget with an intention to make another step forward in its ambitious plans and won its first domestic trophies, the Croatian Cup in 2008 and 2010. It was only a matter of time, when the team will move from its traditional base in Trnsko school sports hall (capacity 3,000) to a bigger one, which happened in 2010, when they moved to Dražen Petrović Basketball Hall, home of their better known rival Cibona. Moving to a new and bigger hall proved to be some kind of "growing up" for KK Zagreb as the club won double title, winning both Championship of Croatia and Croatian Cup in 2011. Zagreb played in the 2011–12 Turkish Airlines Euroleague competition. In 2018 the club was dissolved.

A phoenix club was established in 2020.

Season by season

Honours
Croatian Championship: 1
2011
Croatian Cup: 3
2008, 2010, 2011

Notable players

 Aleksandar Petrović
 Ivan Meheš
 Krunoslav Simon
 Mario Kasun
 Damir Mulaomerović
 Dario Šarić
 Josip Sesar
 Mario Stojić
 Marko Tomas
 Ante Tomić
 Luka Žorić
 Mario Hezonja
 Damir Milačić
 Sašo Ožbolt
 T.J. Ford
 Diante Garrett
 Sean May
 Alex Renfroe
 Mike James
 Josh Heytvelt

References

External links
Official website

KK Zagreb
Basketball teams in Croatia
Basketball teams established in 1970
Basketball teams in Yugoslavia
Basketball teams disestablished in 2018